Princess Vitarah is a Nigerian-American rapper, singer, and songwriter.

Early life
Princess Vitarah was born in the United States, but raised in Nigeria. In the summer of 2015, she moved back to the United States to pursue a career in music.

Career
Princess Vitarah began her career by releasing music through the internet in early 2016. She earned public recognition after her song, "Nigerian Pussy" went viral on video sharing sites such as YouTube and Facebook, receiving 4 million views in the first day alone. She has been featured in many prominent publications including Vice, The Fader, and XXL. In 2021 she announced a move away from her previous sexualised image.

Discography 
In May 2021, Princess Vitarah announced that she had deleted all her previous music and was rebranding herself.

References

External links 
 

1997 births
Nigerian women singer-songwriters
Nigerian singer-songwriters
Nigerian women musicians
American women hip hop singers
American women rappers
Living people
21st-century American rappers
21st-century American women musicians
21st-century Nigerian singers
21st-century American women singers
21st-century American singers
21st-century women rappers